Social apartheid is de facto segregation on the basis of class or economic status, in which an underclass is forced to exist separated from the rest of the population. The word "apartheid", originally an Afrikaans word meaning "separation", gained its current meaning during the South African apartheid that took place between 1948 and early 1994, in which the government declared certain regions as being "for whites only", with the black population forcibly relocated to remote designated areas.

Urban apartheid
Typically a component in social apartheid, urban apartheid refers to the spatial segregation of minorities to remote areas. In the context of the South African apartheid, this is defined by the reassignation of the four racial groups defined by the Population Registration Act of 1950, into group areas as outlined by the Group Areas Act of 1950. Outside of the South African context, the term has also come to be used to refer to ghettoization of minority populations in cities within particular suburbs or neighbourhoods.

Notable cases

Latin America

Brazil and Venezuela

The term has become common in Latin America in particular in societies where the polarization between rich and poor has become pronounced and has been identified in public policy as a problem that needs to be overcome, such as in Venezuela where the supporters of Hugo Chavez identify social apartheid as a reality which the wealthy try to maintain and Brazil, where the term was coined to describe a situation where wealthy neighbourhoods are protected from the general population by walls, electric barbed wire and private security guards and where inhabitants of the poor slums are subjected to violence.

Asia

Malaysia
In Malaysia, as part of the concept of Ketuanan Melayu (lit. Malay supremacy), a citizen that is not considered to be of Bumiputera status face many roadblocks and discrimination in matters such as economic freedom, education, healthcare and housing.

Europe

France and Northern Ireland
The term social apartheid has also been used to explain and describe the ghettoization of Muslim immigrants to Europe in impoverished suburbs and as a cause of rioting and other violence. A notable case is the social situation in the French suburbs, in which largely impoverished Muslim immigrants being concentrated in particular housing projects, and being provided with an inferior standard of infrastructure and social services. The issue of urban apartheid in France was highlighted as such in the aftermath of the 2005 civil unrest in France. It has also be used to describe the segregation in Northern Ireland.

South Africa
In South Africa, the term "social apartheid" has been used to describe persistent post-apartheid forms of exclusion and de facto segregation which exist based on class but which have a racial component because the poor are almost entirely black Africans. "Social apartheid" has been cited as a factor in the composition of HIV/AIDS in South Africa.

See also
 Auto-segregation
 Classism
 Multiculturalism

References

Apartheid
Apartheid in South Africa
Society of South Africa
Racism in Brazil
Society of Venezuela
Society of France
Political science terminology